Arantxa Rus was the defending champion, but lost in the first round to Mariana Duque Mariño.

Duque Mariño then went on to win the title, defeating Estrella Cabeza Candela in the final, 7–6(7–2), 6–1.

Seeds

Main draw

Finals

Top half

Bottom half

References 
 Main draw

The Oaks Club Challenger - Singles